The Ancient Gates of Benin kingdom refers to the nine access point into the Kingdom of Benin, in what is today known as Benin City. The city is known to be surrounded by wide inner walls made of earthwork and moats. In the 1974 edition of the Guiness Book of Records, it described the City walls as the largest earthwork carried out before the Mechanical period. Part of the walls were believed to be about 65 feet tall. The ancient walls in the Benin Kigdom were transformed to the access point or gates to the city. These gates include Iya Uzebu, Iya Osuan, Iya Urh'Ogba, Iya Ivbiyeneva, Iya Uhunmwun Idunmwun, Iya Akpakpava or Iya Ok'Edo, Iya Ewaise, Iya Ero, and Iya Isekhere.

See also 
List of the Ogiso

Kingdom of Benin

Oba of Benin

References 

Edo people